The 1970 UC Riverside Highlanders football team represented the University of California, Riverside as a member of the California Collegiate Athletic Association (CCAA) during the 1970 NCAA College Division football season. Led by first-year head coach Gary Knecht, UC Riverside compiled an overall record of 4–6 with a mark of record of 0–2 in conference play, placing last out of five teams in the CCAA. The team was outscored by its opponents 306 to 192 for the season. The Highlanders played home games at Highlander Stadium in Riverside, California.

Schedule

References

UC Riverside
UC Riverside Highlanders football seasons
UC Riverside Highlanders football